The Canadian Shield, also called the Laurentian Plateau, is a geologic shield, a large area of exposed Precambrian igneous and high-grade metamorphic rocks. It forms the North American Craton (or Laurentia), the ancient geologic core of the North American continent. Glaciation has left the area with only a thin layer of soil, through which exposures of igneous bedrock resulting from its long volcanic history are frequently visible. As a deep, common, joined bedrock region in eastern and central Canada, the Shield stretches north from the Great Lakes to the Arctic Ocean, covering over half of Canada and most of Greenland; it also extends south into the northern reaches of the United States.

Geographical extent 
The Canadian Shield is a physiographic division comprising four smaller physiographic provinces: the Laurentian Upland, Kazan Region, Davis and James. The shield extends into the United States as the Adirondack Mountains (connected by the Frontenac Axis) and the Superior Upland. The Canadian Shield is a U-shaped subsection of the Laurentia craton signifying the area of greatest glacial impact (scraping down to bare rock) creating the thin soils. The age of the Canadian Shield is estimated to be 4.28 Ga. The Canadian Shield once had jagged peaks, higher than any of today's mountains, but millions of years of erosion have changed these mountains to rolling hills.

The Canadian Shield is a collage of Archean plates and accreted juvenile arc terranes and sedimentary basins of the Proterozoic Eon that were progressively amalgamated during the interval 2.45–1.24 Ga, with the most substantial growth period occurring during the Trans-Hudson orogeny, between c. 1.90–1.80 Ga. The Canadian Shield was the first part of North America to be permanently elevated above sea level and has remained almost wholly untouched by successive encroachments of the sea upon the continent. It is the Earth's greatest area of exposed Archean rock. The metamorphic base rocks are mostly from the Precambrian (between 4.5 billion and 540 million years ago) and have been repeatedly uplifted and eroded. During the Pleistocene Epoch, continental ice sheets depressed the land surface (creating Hudson Bay) but also tilted up its northeastern "rim" (the Torngat), scooped out thousands of lake basins, and carried away much of the region's soil. The northeastern portion, however, became tilted up so that, in northern Labrador and Baffin Island, the land rises to more than 1,500 metres (5,000 feet) above sea level.

When the Greenland section is included, the Canadian Shield is approximately circular, bounded on the northeast by the northeast edge of Greenland, with Hudson Bay in the middle. It covers much of Greenland, all of Labrador and the Great Northern Peninsula of Newfoundland, most of Quebec north of the St. Lawrence River, much of Ontario including northern sections of the Ontario Peninsula, the Adirondack Mountains of New York, the northernmost part of Lower Michigan and all of Upper Michigan, northern Wisconsin, northeastern Minnesota, the central and northern portions of Manitoba away from Hudson Bay, northern Saskatchewan, a small portion of northeastern Alberta, mainland Northwest Territories to the east of a line extended north from the Saskatchewan-Alberta border, most of Nunavut's mainland and, of its Arctic Archipelago, Baffin Island and significant bands through Somerset, Southampton, Devon and Ellesmere islands. The true extent of the Shield is greater still and stretches from the Western Cordillera in the west to the Appalachians in the east and as far south as Texas, but these regions are overlaid with much younger rocks and sediment.

Geology 
The Canadian Shield is among the oldest on Earth, with regions dating from 2.5 to 4.2 billion years. The multitude of rivers and lakes in the  region is classical example of a deranged drainage system, caused by the watersheds of the area being disturbed by glaciation and the effect of post-glacial rebound. The Shield was originally an area of very large, very tall mountains (about ) with much volcanic activity, but the area was eroded to nearly its current topographic appearance of relatively low relief over 500 million years ago. Erosion has exposed the roots of the mountains, which take the form of greenstone belts in which belts of volcanic rock that have been altered by metamorphism are surrounded by granitic rock. These belts range in age from 3600 to 2680 million years old. Much of the granitic rock belongs to the distinctive tonalite–trondhjemite–granodiorite family of rocks, which are characteristic of Archean continental crust. Many of Canada's major ore deposits are associated with greenstone belts.

The Sturgeon Lake Caldera in Kenora District, Ontario, is one of the world's best preserved mineralized Neoarchean caldera complexes, which is 2.7 billion years old. The Canadian Shield also contains the Mackenzie dike swarm, which is the largest dike swarm known on Earth.

Mountains have deep roots and float on the denser mantle much like an iceberg at sea. As mountains erode, their roots rise and are eroded in turn. The rocks that now form the surface of the Shield were once far below the Earth's surface.

The high pressures and temperatures at those depths provided ideal conditions for mineralization. Although these mountains are now heavily eroded, many large mountains still exist in Canada's far north called the Arctic Cordillera. This is a vast, deeply dissected mountain range, stretching from northernmost Ellesmere Island to the northernmost tip of Labrador. Precambrian rock is the major component of the bedrock.

The North American craton is the bedrock forming the heart of the North American continent and the Canadian Shield is the largest exposed part of the craton's bedrock.

The Canadian Shield is part of an ancient continent called Arctica, which was formed about 2.5 billion years ago during the Neoarchean era. It was split into Greenland, Laurentia, Scotland, and Siberia, and is now roughly situated in the Arctic around the current North Pole.

Ecology 

The current surface expression of the Shield is one of very thin soil lying on top of the bedrock, with many bare outcrops. This arrangement was caused by severe glaciation during the ice age, which covered the Shield and scraped the rock clean.

The lowlands of the Canadian Shield have a very dense soil that is not suitable for forestation; it also contains many marshes and bogs (muskegs). The rest of the region has coarse soil that does not retain moisture well and is frozen with permafrost throughout the year. Forests are not as dense in the north.

The Shield is covered in parts by vast boreal forests in the south that support natural ecosystems as well as a major logging industry. The boreal forest area gives way to the Eastern Canadian Shield taiga that covers northern Quebec and most of Labrador. The Midwestern Canadian Shield forests that run westwards from Northwestern Ontario have boreal forests that give way to taiga in the most northerly parts of Manitoba and Saskatchewan. Hydrologic drainage is generally poor, the soil compacting effects of glaciation being one of the many causes. Tundra typically prevails in the northern regions. Many mammals such as caribou, white-tailed deer, moose, wolves, wolverines, weasels, mink, otters, grizzly bear, polar bears and black bears are present. In the case of polar bears, the Shield area contains many of their denning locations, such as the Wapusk National Park.

Mining and economics 
The Canadian Shield is one of the world's richest areas in terms of mineral ores. It is filled with substantial deposits of nickel, gold, silver, and copper. Throughout the Shield there are many mining towns extracting these minerals. The largest, and one of the best known, is Sudbury, Ontario. Sudbury is an exception to the normal process of forming minerals in the Shield since the Sudbury Basin is an ancient meteorite impact crater. Ejecta from the meteorite impact was found in the Rove Formation in May 2007. The nearby but less-known Temagami Magnetic Anomaly has striking similarities to the Sudbury Basin. This suggests it could be a second metal-rich impact crater.

In northeastern Quebec, the giant Manicouagan Reservoir is the site of an extensive hydroelectric project (Manic-cinq, or Manic-5). This is one of the largest-known meteorite impact craters on Earth, though not as large as the Sudbury crater; it is currently ranked 5th, while Sudbury is 3rd. 

The Flin Flon greenstone belt in central Manitoba and east-central Saskatchewan "is one of the largest Paleoproterozoic volcanic-hosted massive sulfide (VMS) districts in the world, containing 27 copper-zinc-(gold) deposits from which more than 183 million tonnes of sulfide have been mined."

The Canadian Shield, particularly the portion in the Northwest Territories, has recently been the site of several major diamond discoveries. The kimberlite pipes in which the diamonds are found are closely associated with cratons, which provide the deep lithospheric mantle required to stabilize diamond as a mineral. The kimberlite eruptions then bring the diamonds from over  depth to the surface. The Ekati and Diavik mines are actively mining kimberlite diamonds.

See also 

 Baltic Shield
 Athabasca Basin
 Geology of Ontario
 Platform (geology)
 Oldest rock
 Basement (geology)
 Volcanology of Canada
 Wisconsin Glaciation
 Glacial history of Minnesota

References

Further reading 

 Schwartzenberger, Tina (2005), The Canadian Shield, Weigl Educational, 

Cratons
Geology of North America
Precambrian North America
Regional geology
Shield
Geology of the United States
Precambrian Canada
Precambrian United States
Shield
Stratigraphy of the United States
Geology of Ontario
Geology of Michigan
Geology of Quebec
Geology of Minnesota
Geology of Newfoundland and Labrador
Geology of New York (state)
Geology of Manitoba
Geology of Saskatchewan
Geology of Nunavut
Geology of the Northwest Territories
Geology of Alberta
Geology of Greenland
Shield
Regions of the Subarctic